Wadek Jean André Stanczak (born 30 November 1961) is a French actor. He appeared in more than thirty films since 1984. His parents were immigrants from Poland.

Selected filmography

Awards 
 César Award for Most Promising Actor (1985)

External links 
 

1961 births
Living people
French male film actors
People from Arpajon
French people of Polish descent
Most Promising Actor César Award winners